Şəhriyar (until 2004, Aleksandrovka and Aleksandrovskoe) is a village and municipality in the Sabirabad Rayon of Azerbaijan.  It has a population of 2,526.

References 

Populated places in Sabirabad District